Labidiaster radiosus, the fragile sticky ray star, is a large species of starfish in the family Heliasteridae and was first described by Lütken in 1871. It is found in the waters of southern South America to Sub-Antarctica and the Antarctic Peninsula.

Description 
white. It has a round abdomen with 20-40 arms, often has a pattern of concentric circles radiating out on arms. Labidiaster radiosus may be confused with Labidiaster annulatus and the two have even been considered to be the same species. However, they can be distinguished by closely examining the pedicellaria in the central disc.

Distribution 
Labidiaster radiosus is found on rocky reefs in the waters of southern South America to Sub-Antarctica and the Antarctic Peninsula. it lives at depths of 5-450m with a sea temperature range of -.

Reproduction 
Embryos will hatch into planktonic larvae which later metamorphose into pentamerous juveniles. These develop into young sea stars with short, stubby arms.

References 

Asteroidea
Fauna of Antarctica